Big Beaver is an organized hamlet in the Canadian province of Saskatchewan.

It is referenced in Warren Zevon's song "Hit Somebody (The Hockey Song)" from his 2002 album My Ride's Here. It featured vocals by David Letterman.

Demographics 

References

Designated places in Saskatchewan
Happy Valley No. 10, Saskatchewan
Organized hamlets in Saskatchewan
Division No. 2, Saskatchewan